Diocese of Idukki may refer to:

 Idukki Orthodox Diocese
 Syro-Malabar Catholic Diocese of Idukki